Pilocrocis isozona is a moth in the family Crambidae. It was described by Edward Meyrick in 1936. It is found in Bolivia.

References

Pilocrocis
Moths described in 1936
Moths of South America